This Is What You Get is the sixth album by Norwegian electronic band Flunk released in 2009 on Beatservice Records.

Track listing
 Dying to See You
 Common Sense
 Cigarette Burns
 Ride
 Love Hearts
 Speedskating
 Stain
 Cardboard Rebel
 Shoreline
 Down
 Karma Police

External links
 Official Band album website
 Official Label album website

2009 albums
Flunk albums